

Events
Tiglath-Pileser III conquers the city of Arpad in Syria after two years of siege.
Start of Ahaz's reign of Judah

Births

Deaths

References

740s BC